Tropical crabgrass crab. Digitaria and may refer to:

 
 
 Digitaria ciliaris